Freestyle skiing is one of the six skiing disciplines contested at the Winter Olympic Games, and one of the youngest. In 1924, the first Winter Olympics featured Nordic skiing disciplines (cross-country skiing, ski jumping, and Nordic combined), while alpine skiing was first contested in 1936. Only at the 1992 Winter Olympics, in Albertville, France, were freestyle skiing events first held as official medal events. Before that, freestyle skiing was contested at the 1988 Winter Olympics as a demonstration sport, consisting of events for both men and women in three variants: moguls, aerials and ski ballet. In Albertville, moguls was the first-ever official freestyle skiing medal event; aerials and ski ballet were also held but still as demonstration events. The growing popularity of aerials convinced the International Olympic Committee (IOC) to add this freestyle discipline to the 1994 Winter Olympics official program. Moguls and aerials have thus been contested at every Winter Games since. Ski cross inclusion in the Winter Olympics program was approved at an IOC Executive Board meeting in November 2006, and the first events were held at the 2010 Winter Olympics.

At the 2002 Winter Olympics, two days after Steve Bradbury gave Australia its first-ever Winter Olympic gold medal, Alisa Camplin won the freestyle aerials event, becoming the first Australian woman to win gold at the Winter Games; four years later, she collected a second consecutive medal, a bronze. In 2010, the third Olympics hosted by Canada finally consecrated a Canadian athlete as Olympic champion: Alexandre Bilodeau took the gold medal in the men's moguls, overcoming defending champion Dale Begg-Smith of Australia.
Kari Traa of Norway has won three medals (one gold, one silver, one bronze) in three successive Games, more than any other freestyle skier at the Winter Olympics. Alexandre Bilodeau and David Wise are the most successful male freestyle skiers, with two gold medals. Alexandre Bilodeau was also the first freestyle skier to win back to back gold medals when he won gold in the 2010 and 2014 moguls. The youngest freestyle skier to win an Olympic medal is Swiss Mathilde Gremaud, who secured a silver in 2018 with 18 years old, while Tatjana Mittermayer of Germany is the oldest medalist, following her silver in the 1998 moguls event, aged 33.

Overall, 132 medals (44 of each color) have been awarded to  skiers representing 22 National Olympic Committees (NOC).



Men

Moguls

Medals:

Aerials

Medals:

Big air

Medals:

Halfpipe

Ski cross

Slopestyle

Women

Moguls

Medals:

Aerials

Medals:

Big Air

Medals:

Halfpipe

Ski cross

Slopestyle

Medals:

Mixed

Aerials team

Statistics

Athlete medal leaders

Athletes who won at least two medals are listed below.

Medals per year

Medal sweep events
These are events in which athletes from one NOC won all three medals.

See also
 Lists of Olympic medalists
 Freestyle skiing at the Winter Olympics
 List of Olympic venues in freestyle skiing
 FIS Freestyle World Ski Championships
 FIS Freestyle Ski World Cup

References
General
 ** 1992 1994 1998 2002

Specific

External links
 Olympic Review and Revue Olympique. LA84 Foundation

Freestyle skiing
medalists